Red Cross and similar corps of social work organizations shaped military social work. Role of military social workers were important during the World Wars. Over one million soldiers were admitted to American Army hospitals for neuro-psychiatric problems in each wars. Commissioned status for social workers were achieved in 1945 but full status were given in the 1950s.

Duties 
Counsel military personnel and their family members
Supervise counselors and caseworkers
Survey military personnel to identify problems and plan solutions
Plan social action programs to rehabilitate personnel with problems
Plan and monitor equal opportunity programs
Conduct research on social problems and programs
Organize community activities on military bases
Active Duty, Reserve, and National Guard Social Workers can and do deploy to war zones to assist service members with combat or operational stress disorders.

Civilian counterparts 
Civilian social workers work for hospitals, human service agencies and federal, state, county and city governments. They perform duties similar to those performed by military social workers. However, civilian social workers usually specialize in a particular field, such as family services, child welfare, or medical services. They may also be called social group workers, medical social workers, psychiatric social worker, and social welfare administrators.

Civilian social workers in the military provide family advocacy services, such as conducting assessments on cases involving domestic violence or child abuse within a military family.

Military families have historically demonstrated significant resilience in the face of numerous challenges,  though, in the United States, this resilience of military families has, in many psychosocial domains, entirely eroded as a result of circumstances associated with the longest armed conflict in national history (Cox & Waller, 2016). This recognition, combined with a compelling and emerging empirical imperative addressing unique needs of family members of both current and former service members has resulted in graduate clinical social work programs (MSW) offering specialized training in working with military families, which can be found in several Universities. 

Social work functions of the American Red Cross SAF

Ethical dilemmas 
Besides ethical dilemmas that are inherent to all social workers, the policies and practices in the military cause even more issues. 

The dual profession of the military social worker
The multi-purpose role of the social worker as a human service provider
Hierarchical structure governed by military law (Uniform Code of Military Justice)
Dual clients (active-duty and civilians)
Geographic and professional isolation

References 
 
 
 Social Work in the Military: Ethical Dilemmas and Training Implications, S. H. Tallant, University of Wisconsin, Eau Claire.
 Batalova, J. (2008). Immigrants in the U.S. Armed Forces.
 Iraq War Clinician Guide - 2nd Edition, United States Department of Veterans Affairs
 Melinda Gelder, Ph.D., Meeting the Enemy, Becoming a Friend, covers skills in military social work. 

Specific

Military life
Social work